The Highway B-29 Bridge is a historic bridge in Prairie Grove, Arkansas. It is a single-span concrete arch bridge, carrying Washington County Route 623 across the Illinois River. Built in 1923, the bridge is one of the first built in the county  by the Luten Bridge Company, which used an innovative technique involving metal rings (polished for visual effect on this bridge) that reduced the amount of material required for the structure.

The bridge was listed on the National Register of Historic Places in 2008.

See also
National Register of Historic Places listings in Washington County, Arkansas
List of bridges on the National Register of Historic Places in Arkansas

References

Road bridges on the National Register of Historic Places in Arkansas
Bridges completed in 1923
National Register of Historic Places in Washington County, Arkansas
Arch bridges in the United States
Concrete bridges in the United States
1923 establishments in Arkansas
Transportation in Washington County, Arkansas
Illinois River (Oklahoma)